Roberta Farnham Maxwell (born June 17, 1941) is a Canadian stage, film, and television actress.

Biography
 
Maxwell began studying for the stage in her early teens. She joined John Clark for two years as the child co-host of his Junior Magazine series for CBC Television. She first performed at the Stratford Shakespeare Festival in 1956.

She appeared as Ursula in Much Ado About Nothing, Lady Anne in Richard III, Olivia in Twelfth Night, and Anne in The Merry Wives of Windsor, before going on to England, where she spent three years in repertory. She made her West End debut with Robert Morley and Molly Picon in A Majority of One.

In 1982, she starred as Rosalind in the Stratford Festival's stage production of Shakespeare's As You Like It, a production which was videotaped and telecast on Canadian television in 1983. In 2011, she played the duchess of York in Richard III

She first traveled to New York at age 19 in 1960. She debuted on Broadway in The Prime of Miss Jean Brodie in 1968, going on to five more plays with the Tyrone Guthrie Theatre in Minneapolis, Minnesota. In 1974, she was back on Broadway playing the role of Jill in Equus, which starred Anthony Hopkins and Peter Firth.

She played Lavinia Mannion  in the 1978 PBS adaption of Mourning Becomes Electra. In 2009-10 she appeared in two episodes of the Syfy series Warehouse 13.

Filmography

Awards and recognition
 1970: Obie Award, Whistle in the Dark
 1971: Drama Desk Award, Slag (David Hare's first play)
 1977: Obie Award, Ashes (with Brian Murray for Joseph Papp and Manhattan Theatre Club)

References

External links
 
 

Living people
Canadian film actresses
Canadian stage actresses
Canadian television actresses
Canadian voice actresses
Place of birth missing (living people)
Canadian Shakespearean actresses
Actresses from Toronto
Dora Mavor Moore Award winners
1941 births